The West of il-Ħaġra s-Sewda to ix-Xaqqa Cliffs Important Bird Area comprises a 4 ha linear strip of cliffed coastline in Siġġiewi, on the southern coast of Malta, in the Maltese archipelago of the Mediterranean Sea. Its steep and rugged cliffs rise from sea level to a height of 68 m. It was identified as an Important Bird Area (IBA) by BirdLife International because it supports 500–1000 breeding pairs of Cory's shearwaters and 80–100 pairs of yelkouan shearwaters.

See also
 List of birds of Malta

References

Seabird colonies
Important Bird Areas of Malta
Siġġiewi
Qrendi
Żurrieq
Cliffs of Malta